Florence Foster Jenkins (born Narcissa Florence Foster; July 19, 1868 – November 26, 1944) was an American socialite and amateur soprano who became known, and mocked, for her flamboyant performance costumes and notably poor singing ability. Stephen Pile ranked her "the world's worst opera singer... No one, before or since, has succeeded in liberating themselves quite so completely from the shackles of musical notation."

Despite – or perhaps because of – her technical incompetence she became a prominent musical cult-figure in New York City during the 1920s, 1930s, and 1940s. Cole Porter, Gian Carlo Menotti, Lily Pons, Sir Thomas Beecham, and other celebrities were fans. Enrico Caruso reportedly "regarded her with affection and respect".

The poet William Meredith wrote that a Jenkins recital "was never exactly an aesthetic experience, or only to the degree that an early Christian among the lions provided aesthetic experience; it was chiefly immolatory, and Madame Jenkins was always eaten, in the end."

Personal life and early career
Narcissa Florence Foster was born July 19, 1868, in Wilkes-Barre, Pennsylvania, the daughter of Charles Dorrance Foster (1836–1909), an attorney and scion of a wealthy land-owning Pennsylvania family, and Mary Jane Hoagland Foster (1851–1930). Her only sibling, a younger sister named Lillian, died of diphtheria in 1883 at the age of eight.

Foster said her interest in public performance began when she was seven years old. A pianist, she performed at society functions as "Little Miss Foster", and gave a recital at the White House during the administration of Rutherford B. Hayes. Miss Foster attended the Moravian Seminary for Young Ladies in Bethlehem, Pa. from September 1881 to March 1882, where she was among 20 students in the “Fourth Room”. Shortly after 4:00 p.m. on Tuesday, December 20, 1881, F. Foster performed a vocal duet of “Two Merry Alpine Maids” as part of the annual Christmas service. Composed by Stephen Glover (1813-1870), this particular number was described by London’s Musical Herald as “a gay duet, with yodel and la la passages…” In a little under a year at the Bethlehem Female Seminary, Florence Foster paid over $100 for music instruction and sheet music (this amounts to almost $2,200 in 2016 dollars). Miss Foster’s interest in music is further evidenced by her purchase of hymnals. Additionally, she purchased books in mythology, elementary algebra, rhetoric, and history. Florence Foster did not graduate from the Bethlehem Female Seminary.After graduating from high school, her hopes of studying music in Europe were dashed when her father refused permission and funding. On July 11, 1883, ten days after the funeral of her sister, and eight days before her 15th birthday, Florence married Dr. Francis Thornton Jenkins, a physician 16 years her senior, in Philadelphia (in 1880, the age of consent for marriage in Pennsylvania was ten years old). The following year, after learning that she had contracted syphilis from her husband, she ended their relationship and reportedly never spoke of him again. Florence Foster Jenkins resided at The Newport, built in 1897 in Philadelphia at 1530-1532 Spruce Street, on the southeast corner of 16th. The 9-story luxurious high-rise is still in operation as of 2016. Years later, she claimed to have been granted a divorce decree on March 24, 1902, although no documentation of any such ruling has been found. She retained the Jenkins surname for the remainder of her life.

After an arm injury ended her aspirations as a pianist, Jenkins gave piano lessons in Philadelphia to support herself, but around 1900 she moved with her mother to New York City. In 1909, in her early forties, Jenkins met a 33-year-old British actor named St. Clair Bayfield; they began a vaguely defined cohabitation relationship that continued the rest of her life. Upon her father's death later that year, Jenkins became the beneficiary of a sizable trust, and resolved to resume her musical career as a singer with Bayfield as her manager. She began taking voice lessons and immersed herself in wealthy New York City society, joining dozens of social clubs. As the "chairman of music" for many of these organizations, she began producing lavish tableaux vivants, popular diversions in upper-crust social circles of that era. In each of these productions, Jenkins would cast herself as the main character in the final tableau, wearing an elaborate costume of her own design. In a widely republished photograph, Jenkins poses in a costume, complete with angelic wings, from her tableau inspired by Howard Chandler Christy's painting Stephen Foster and the Angel of Inspiration.

Jenkins began giving private vocal recitals in 1912 when she was 44 years old. In 1917, she became founder and President Soprano Hostess of her own social organization, the Verdi Club. Its membership quickly swelled to over 400; honorary members included Enrico Caruso and Geraldine Farrar. When Jenkins's mother died in 1930, additional financial resources became available for the expansion and promotion of her singing career.

Vocal career

According to published reviews and other contemporary accounts, Jenkins's proficiency at the piano did not translate well to her singing. She is described as having great difficulty with such basic vocal skills as pitch, rhythm, and sustaining notes and phrases.  In recordings, her accompanist Cosmé McMoon can be heard making adjustments to compensate for her constant tempo variations and rhythmic mistakes, but there was little he could do to conceal her inaccurate intonation. She was consistently flat, sometimes considerably so. Her diction was similarly substandard, particularly with foreign-language lyrics.

The difficult operatic arias that Jenkins chose to perform—all well beyond her technical ability and vocal range—served only to emphasize these deficiencies. "There's no way to even pedagogically discuss it", said vocal instructor Bill Schuman. "It's amazing that she's even attempting to sing that music." The opera impresario Ira Siff, who dubbed her "the anti-Callas", said, "Jenkins was exquisitely bad, so bad that it added up to quite a good evening of theater ... She would stray from the original music, and do insightful and instinctual things with her voice, but in a terribly distorted way. There was no end to the horribleness ... They say Cole Porter had to bang his cane into his foot in order not to laugh out loud when she sang. She was that bad." Nevertheless, Porter rarely missed a recital.

The question of whether "Lady Florence"—as she liked to be called, and often signed her autographs—was in on the joke, or honestly believed she had vocal talent, remains a matter of debate. On the one hand, she compared herself favorably with renowned sopranos Frieda Hempel and Luisa Tetrazzini, and seemed oblivious to the abundant audience laughter during her performances. Her loyal friends endeavored to disguise the laughter with cheers and applause; they often described her technique to curious inquirers in "intentionally ambiguous" terms. For example, "her singing at its finest suggests the untrammeled swoop of some great bird". Favorable articles and bland reviews, published in specialty music publications such as The Musical Courier, were most likely written by her friends or herself. "I would say that she maybe didn't know [how badly she sang]", said mezzo-soprano Marilyn Horne. "We can't hear ourselves as others hear us." Nerve damage due to syphilis and its treatment (see below) may have physically compromised her hearing as well.

On the other hand, Jenkins refused to open her performances to the general public, and was clearly aware of her detractors. "People may say I can't sing", she once remarked to a friend, "but no one can ever say I didn't sing." She dismissed her original accompanist, Edwin McArthur, after catching him giving her audience "a knowing smile" during a performance. She went to great lengths to control access to her private recitals, which took place at her apartment, in small clubs, and each October at the Verdi Club's annual "Ball of the Silver Skylarks" in the Ritz-Carlton Hotel's Grand Ballroom. Attendance, by personal invitation only, was restricted to her loyal clubwomen and a select few others. Jenkins handled distribution of the coveted tickets herself, carefully excluding strangers, particularly music critics. "There's no way she could not have known", said Schuman. "No one is that unaware ... she loved the audience reaction and she loved singing. But she knew."

Despite her careful efforts to insulate her singing from public exposure, a preponderance of contemporaneous opinion favored the view that Jenkins's self-delusion was genuine. "At that time Frank Sinatra had started to sing, and the teenagers used to faint during his notes and scream", McMoon told an interviewer. "So she thought she was producing the same kind of an effect." "Florence didn't think she was pulling anyone's leg", said opera historian Albert Innaurato. "She was compos mentis, not a lunatic. She was a very proper, complex individual." As an anonymous obituary writer later put it, "Her ears, schooled in constant introversion, heard only the radiant tones which never issued forth to quell the mirth of her audiences."

Her recitals featured arias from the standard operatic repertoire by Mozart, Verdi, and Johann Strauss; lieder by Brahms; Valverde's Spanish waltz "Clavelitos" ("Little Carnations"); and songs composed by herself and McMoon. As in her tableaux, she complemented her performances with elaborate costumes of her own design, often involving wings, tinsel, and flowers. She would perform "Clavelitos" dressed as Carmen, complete with castanets and a wicker basket of flowers, clicking the castanets and tossing the flowers one by one. When she ran out of flowers, she flung the basket too—and then the castanets. Her fans, aware that "Clavelitos" was her favorite song, would usually demand an encore, prompting her to send McMoon into the audience to retrieve flowers, basket, and castanets so that she could sing the number again.

Once when a taxi in which she was riding collided with another car, Jenkins let out a high-pitched scream. Upon arriving home, she went immediately to her piano and confirmed (at least to herself) that the note she had screamed was the fabled F above high C, a pitch she had never before been able to reach. Overjoyed, she refused to press charges against either involved party, and even sent the taxi driver a box of expensive cigars. McMoon said neither he "nor anyone else" ever heard her actually sing a high F, however.

At the age of 76, Jenkins finally yielded to public demand and booked Carnegie Hall for a general-admission performance that took place on October 25, 1944. Tickets for the event sold out weeks in advance; the demand was such that an estimated 2,000 people were turned away at the door of the 2,800-seat venue. Numerous celebrities attended, including Porter, Marge Champion, Gian Carlo Menotti, Kitty Carlisle, and Lily Pons with her husband, Andre Kostelanetz, who composed a song for the recital. McMoon later recalled a moment: "[When she sang] 'If my silhouette does not convince you yet/My figure surely will' [from Adele's aria in Die Fledermaus], she put her hands righteously to her hips and went into a circular dance that was the most ludicrous thing I have ever seen. And created a pandemonium in the place. One famous actress had to be carried out of her box because she became so hysterical."

Since ticket distribution was out of Jenkins's control for the first time, mockers, scoffers, and critics could no longer be kept at bay. The following morning's newspapers were filled with scathing, sarcastic reviews that devastated Jenkins, according to Bayfield. "[Mrs. Jenkins] has a great voice", wrote the New York Sun critic. "In fact, she can sing everything except notes ... Much of her singing was hopelessly lacking in a semblance of pitch, but the further a note was from its proper elevation the more the audience laughed and applauded." The New York Post was even less charitable: "Lady Florence ... indulged last night in one of the weirdest mass jokes New York has ever seen."

Five days after the concert, Jenkins suffered a heart attack while shopping at G. Schirmer's music store, and died a month later on November 26, 1944, at her Manhattan residence, the Hotel Seymour. She was buried next to her father in the Foster mausoleum, Hollenback Cemetery, Wilkes-Barre, Pennsylvania.

Possible influence of health problems
Some of Jenkins's performance difficulties have been attributed to untreated syphilis, which causes progressive deterioration of the central nervous system in its later stages. Nerve damage and other morbidities caused by the disease may have been compounded by toxic side effects—such as hearing loss—from mercury and arsenic, the prevailing (and largely ineffective) remedies of the pre-antibiotic era. By the time penicillin became generally available in the 1940s, Jenkins's disease had progressed to the tertiary stage, which is unresponsive to antibiotics.

Recordings

Audio
The only professional audio recordings of Jenkins consist of nine selections on five 78-rpm records (Melotone Recording Studio, New York City, 1941–1944), produced by Jenkins, at her expense, and sold to her friends at $2.50 a copy. The selections include four coloratura arias from operas by Mozart, Delibes, Johann Strauss II, and Félicien David, and five art songs, two written for Jenkins by her accompanist, Cosmé McMoon. Seven of the selections were released by RCA Victor on a 10-inch LP in 1954, and reissued on a 12-inch LP in 1962, The Glory of the Human Voice.
 A-side
 Mozart: "Queen of the Night aria", from The Magic Flute (in English)
 Liadoff: "The Musical Snuff-Box" (English version by Adele Epstein)
 McMoon: "Like a Bird" (words by Jenkins)
 Delibes: "Bell Song", from Lakmé (in French)
 David: "Charmant oiseau" (with flute and piano), from La perle du Brésil (in French)
 Bach/: "Biassy" (based on the prelude from Bach's Prelude and Fugue in G minor, BWV 861, words by Alexander Pushkin, in Russian)
 Johann Strauss II: "Mein Herr Marquis" (Adele's Laughing Song) from Die Fledermaus (English version by Lorraine Noel Finley)
 B-side A Faust Travesty (from Gounod's Faust), Jenny Williams (soprano), Thomas Burns (piano)
 "Valentine's Aria" (Ere I leave my native land)
 "Jewel Song" (O heavenly jewels)
 "Salut, demeure" (Emotions strange)
 Final Trio (My heart is overcome with terror, sung as a duet)

The material has since been reissued in various combinations on four CDs:
 The Glory of the Human Voice (Sony Classical/RCA Victor Gold Seal, 1992),  a reissue of the 1962 Victor recording with the song "Serenata Mexicana" by McMoon added.
 The Truly Unforgettable Voice of Florence Foster Jenkins (Sony Classical/RCA Red Seal 88985319622)
(2016 Remaster, same as previous RCA Victor CD but includes an interview with Cosmé McMoon)
 Florence Foster Jenkins & Friends: Murder on the High Cs (Naxos Records, 2003) contains the eight selections from the 1992 reissue of Glory(????) plus "Valse Caressante" by McMoon.
 The Muse Surmounted: Florence Foster Jenkins and Eleven of Her Rivals (Homophone Records, 2004) includes one Jenkins song, "Valse Caressante", plus a brief interview with McMoon.

Film
Jenkins commissioned filming of her performances at the Verdi Club's signature annual event, the "Ball of the Silver Skylarks", held each October at the Ritz Carlton Hotel. All were thought lost until copies of the 1934 through 1939 and 1941 films were discovered in 2009. Jenkins historian Donald Collup has announced plans to feature excerpts from her filmed performances in an upcoming documentary.

In popular culture

Stage productions
 Precious Few, a play about Jenkins and the English novelist Ronald Firbank, by Terry Sneed, premiered in 1994 at Wildwood Park for the Performing Arts in Little Rock, Arkansas.
 Goddess of Song, a one-woman play by South African playwright Charles J. Fourie, performed by Carolyn Lewis, was staged in 1999 at the Coffee Lounge in Cape Town, South Africa.
 Viva La Diva, by Chris Ballance, debuted in 2001 at the Edinburgh Fringe.
 Souvenir: a Fantasia on Florence Foster Jenkins, by Stephen Temperley, opened off-Broadway at the York Theatre in 2004 with Jack Lee as Cosme McMoon and Judy Kaye as Jenkins. After an interim engagement at the Berkshire Theater Festival, it opened on Broadway at the Lyceum Theater in 2005, directed by Vivian Matalon and starring Donald Corren and Judy Kaye. Kaye summarized the difficulties of her role: "It's hard work to sing badly well. You could sing badly badly for a while, but you'll hurt yourself if you do it for long."
 Glorious!, by Peter Quilter, opened in 2005 in London's West End with Maureen Lipman starring as Jenkins. It was nominated for an Olivier Award as Best New Comedy, and has since been performed in more than 40 countries in 27 languages.

Other media
 Anne McCaffrey's 1994 short piece "Euterpe on a Fling" is a fictional interview with Jenkins that drew from facts known about her life and career.
 The biographical documentary Florence Foster Jenkins: A World of Her Own was released in 2007.
 "Florence Foster Jenkins", a track on the 2009 self-titled album by the indie folk band Everyday Visuals, is "a salute to artists who stubbornly strive against long odds".
 Jenkins was the subject of the "Not My Job" segment of NPR's radio program Wait Wait... Don't Tell Me! on October 25, 2009.  NBC news anchor Brian Williams, the show's special guest, was asked a series of trivia questions about Jenkins, whom he nicknamed "Flo Fo". The broadcast took place in Carnegie Hall on the 65th anniversary of her performance there.
 The 2015 French feature film Marguerite was loosely inspired by Jenkins's life and career.
 Florence Foster Jenkins, a British bio-pic starring Meryl Streep in the title role, was directed by Stephen Frears and premiered in London on April 12, 2016, and in New York on August 12, 2016.  Streep was widely praised for her portrayal, and received an Academy Award nomination.

Notes

References

Sources

External links

 
 Florence Foster Jenkins ephemera, a scrapbook kept for Jenkins and her husband, St. Clair Bayfield, in the Music Division of The New York Public Library for the Performing Arts
 Liner-notes from the RCA CD, photos, and an article on Jenkins by Daniel Dixon
 Maureen Lipman, "Playing the diva of din", The Guardian, November 3, 2005
 "Tra-la-laughable, but loving it" about the play Glorious!, The Sydney Morning Herald (October 4, 2007)
 5 People Who Failed Their Way to Fame And Fortune – #2. Florence Foster Jenkins

1868 births
1944 deaths
American people of Welsh descent
American socialites
American sopranos
Child classical musicians
Humor in classical music
Outsider musicians
People from Wilkes-Barre, Pennsylvania
RCA Victor artists
Singers from Pennsylvania
Classical musicians from Pennsylvania
20th-century American women  opera singers